Port Amherst is an unincorporated community in Kanawha County, West Virginia, United States. Port Amherst is located on the Kanawha River southeast of Charleston. It is the northern terminus of the West Virginia Turnpike and is also served by U.S. Route 60. It was also known as Reed.

References

Unincorporated communities in Kanawha County, West Virginia
Unincorporated communities in West Virginia
Coal towns in West Virginia
Populated places on the Kanawha River